Carlo Albini (22 March 1914 – 18 November 1976) was an Italian footballer who played as a defender. He spent his entire career with Brescia.

References

1914 births
1976 deaths
Footballers from Brescia
Italian footballers
Association football defenders
Brescia Calcio players
Serie A players